Kolding IF is an association football club based in Kolding, Denmark. The team competes in the Danish 2nd Division, the third tier of Danish football, after suffering relegation at the end of the 2020–21 season. Founded in 1895, Kolding IF played in the top-flight 1982 and 1983 Danish 1st Division championships. In 2002, they joined forces with Kolding Boldklub, the other major football club in Kolding, to form the cooperative Kolding FC first team. The joint club merged with Vejle Boldklub in 2011 to form Vejle Boldklub Kolding. This merger was dissolved in 2013 and Kolding IF reemerged.

Current squad

b

Out on loan

Noted players
 1950s–60s: Jørgen Lildballe (1955), holds the record for most first team matches – 386.
 1980s: Jan Mølby (1981), played on the Danish national team, and went to European top clubs afterwards.

Achievements
Jutland Championships
Winners (2): 1930–31, 1935–36
Runners-up (5): 1905, 1906, 1907, 1908, 1909, 1942
Jutland Cup
Runners-up (1): 1939–40

See also
Kolding FC
Kolding Boldklub

References

External links
 Official site

 
Football clubs in Denmark
Kolding
Association football clubs established in 1895
1895 establishments in Denmark